Boozed, Broozed & Broken-Boned is a DVD by American heavy metal band Black Label Society, released on August 12, 2003. It was recorded at the Harpos Concert Theatre in Detroit, Michigan, on September 14, 2002.

History
Released in 2003, Boozed, Broozed & Broken-Boned was recorded at the Harpos Concert Theatre in Detroit, Michigan, on September 14, 2002. On March 6, 2013, an unblackened version of the concert was released. It was recorded at Club Nokia in Los Angeles, California. On June 13 and 19, 2020, both the unblackened and original recording of Boozed, Broozed & Broken-Boned were streamed via YouTube.

Track listing
"Demise of Sanity"
"Graveyard Disciples"
"Bleed for Me"
"13 Years of Grief"
"Stronger Than Death"
"Genocide Junkies"
"Spoke in the Wheel"
"Born to Lose"
"World of Trouble"
"Guitar Solo"
"Band Intros"
"All for You"
"Super Terrorizer"
"Berserkers"

Extra features
Interview with Zakk Wylde
Lesson from Zakk's instructional video "Hardcore Vol. 1"
"Stillborn" music video
Tokyo Chapter performance footage
3 Mins. with Rae Rae
Slightly Amped (acoustic performance)
Discography
Stupid Shit (outtakes)
The Star Spangled Banner (live at a Los Angeles Kings game)

Personnel
Zakk Wylde - vocals, guitar
Nick Catanese - guitar, backing vocals
Robert Trujillo - bass
Craig Nunenmacher - drums
Mike Inez - bass (Tokyo performance)
Brian P Slusarz - art and layout

References

External links

Black Label Society video albums
2003 video albums
2003 live albums
Live video albums